Incheon Namdong Asiad Rugby Field (Hangul: 남동아시아드럭비경기장) is a multi-purpose stadium located in Incheon, South Korea. It is used for rugby and football matches, and is the home ground of the South Korea national rugby union team and Incheon Hyundai Steel Red Angels of the WK League. The stadium also hosted the rugby sevens events at the 2014 Asian Games.

References

External links 
 2014 Incheon Asian Games Website Official Introduction

Sports venues in Incheon
Rugby union stadiums in South Korea
Football venues in South Korea
Venues of the 2014 Asian Games
Multi-purpose stadiums in South Korea
Sports venues completed in 2013
2013 establishments in South Korea